Alokendu Lahiri (born 11 November 1975) is an Indian former cricketer. He played 22 first-class matches for Bengal between 1994 and 2003.

See also
 List of Bengal cricketers

References

External links
 

1975 births
Living people
Indian cricketers
Bengal cricketers
Cricketers from Kolkata